Naigaon is a monorail station on Line 1 of the Mumbai Monorail located at Spring Mill Complex in the Wadala suburb of Mumbai, India. Lies on the GD Ambedkar Marg which is nearby Spring Mill Complex.

References

Mumbai Monorail stations